Por Ti may refer to:

 Por ti (Mexican TV series)
 Por Ti (2022 TV series)
 Por Ti (album), by Ednita Nazario
 Por ti, an album by the Banda el Recodo
 "Por ti" (Belanova song)
 "Por ti", a song by Ally Brooke
 "Por ti", a song by Óscar Chávez
 "Por ti", a song by Florentino and Bad Gyal
 "Por ti", a song by Dalex, Dímelo Flow and Rauw Alejandro
 "Por ti", a song by Morbo from Morbo
 "Por ti", a song by Tito "El Bambino" and Lenny Tavárez

See also